APPF may refer to:
 Authority for European Political Parties and European Political Foundations, a body of the European Union
 Asia Pacific Parliamentary Forum
 Afghan Public Protection Force